Living Will is an American comedy film starring Ryan Dunn, Gerard Haitz and April Scott.

Cast
Ryan Dunn - Belcher
Gerard Haitz - Will
April Scott - Krista

Production
In 2011, the domestic distribution rights to the film were purchased by Lions Gate Entertainment. The studio had originally planned an October 2011 release for the film but after the death of Ryan Dunn on June 20, 2011, the studio announced that it no longer had any plans to release the film theatrically. The film was released direct-to-video on October 4, 2011.

External links
 Official Website for the movie
 

2011 comedy films
2011 films
American comedy films
2010s English-language films
2010s American films